Nikola Đurić (born 6 November 1989) is a Serbian football defender who plays for Inđija. He previously played for Serbian clubs Obilić, BASK, Novi Pazar, and Čukarički and Greece Football League club Ethnikos Gazoros.

References

External links
 
 Nikola Đurić stats at utakmica.rs
 Nikola Đurić stats at footballdatabase.eu

1989 births
Living people
Association football defenders
Serbian footballers
FK Obilić players
FK BASK players
FK Novi Pazar players
FK Čukarički players
FK Rad players
Flamurtari Vlorë players
FK Proleter Novi Sad players
FK Dinamo Vranje players
OFK Bačka players
FK Budućnost Podgorica players
FK Inđija players
Serbian SuperLiga players
Kategoria Superiore players
Serbian First League players
Montenegrin First League players
Serbian expatriate footballers
Serbian expatriate sportspeople in Greece
Serbian expatriate sportspeople in Albania
Serbian expatriate sportspeople in Montenegro
Expatriate footballers in Greece
Expatriate footballers in Albania
Expatriate footballers in Montenegro